Ambassador Hawa Olga Ndilowe (born 1960) is a Malawian civil servant and current Chief Secretary to the government in Malawi. She is a former ambassador to the United States for Malawi. She has received international recognition for championing female education.

Career
She received her bachelor's degree in social science with concentrations in economics and mathematics from the University of Malawi, Chancellor College. After this, she obtained a master's degree in Information Systems from the London School of Economics. She soon worked as an Information Systems Analyst in Malawi, and then as a Permanent Secretary in the public service.  She has been a civil servant since 1981. She was the ambassador to the United States for Malawi in 2006 and was accredited for Argentina, Brazil, Canada, Colombia, Cuba and Mexico. Then she began working as Principal Secretary for e-Government after her post in Washington, D.C. She was later promoted to Deputy Chief Secretary and later Chief Secretary to the President and Cabinet. In 2015 she was appointed Malawi Ambassador to the Republic of Tanzania till December 2017. Mrs Hawa Olga Ndilowe retired from the civil service in March 2020.

Personal life
Her father, Vanwell Masamba, was a prosperous businessman who owned a fleet of luxury taxis in Blantyre, the commercial capital of Malawi. She has one son and three daughters.

References

Malawian civil servants
Living people
1960 births
Ambassadors of Malawi to the United States
High Commissioners of Malawi to Canada
Ambassadors of Malawi to Argentina
Ambassadors of Malawi to Brazil
Ambassadors of Malawi to Colombia
Ambassadors of Malawi to Cuba
Ambassadors of Malawi to Mexico
Ambassadors of Malawi to Tanzania
University of Malawi alumni
Malawian women diplomats
Women ambassadors